The 1974–75 RFU National KO competition was the fourth edition of England's premier rugby union club competition at the time. Bedford won the competition defeating Rosslyn Park in the final. The final was held at Twickenham Stadium.
This Final was the last appearance at Twickenham of one of England's finest players Budge Rogers.

Draw and results

First round

Progress to next round as away team*

Second round

Quarter-finals

Semi-finals

Final

References

1974–75 rugby union tournaments for clubs
1974–75 in English rugby union
RFU Knockout Cup